The Marché du Film (french for "Film Market") is one of the largest film markets in the world. Established in 1959, it is held annually in conjunction with the Festival de Cannes as known as the Cannes Film Festival.

With 12,500 participants from 121 different countries, more than 4,000 films and projects were presented in 2019.

History

1950
Before the Marché du Film was created, film production companies rented the Antibes cinema rooms to show their films and organize the beginnings of a film market.

In 1950, Robert Favre Le Bret, Executive Director of the Festival de Cannes, suggested to include a film market in the Festival de Cannes. His suggestion was rejected.

The Marché du Film was finally created in 1959, by two members of the “Chambre Syndicale des Producteurs de Film Français” (lit. Trade Union Chamber of French Film Producers), Émile Natan and Bertrand Bagge, under the authorization of Robert Favre Le Bret and Minister of Culture André Malraux.

Émile Natan and Bertrand Bagge wanted to take advantage of the international influence that the festival was starting to have by arranging screenings of French Films for the international attendees of the Cannes Film Festival and therefore expand business opportunities for the French Film Industry.

1970
In 1979, the Cannes city council decided to build a new facility for the film festival and film market, the Palais des Festival et des Congrès, in response to the growing success of the film festival. The new building, a six-story building designed by architects Sir Hubert Bennett and François Druet, was constructed on the site of the municipal Casino at the top of blvd. de la Croisette, east of the port.
 
That same year, Marcel Lathière, the new director of the market was in charge of the move to the “Palais”. This new building allowed the market to expand the number of screening rooms from 4 to 10 while welcoming a larger number of exhibitor booths.

1980
In 1980, L’Association du Festival (lit. the festival association) decided to establish the Secrétariat Général du Marché du Film (lit. General Secretariat of the film market) with Michel Bonnet and Marcel Lathière in charge. They started to slowly set up the Marché du Film by introducing fares for films subscriptions and booth rentals. In 1982, the new "Palais des Festival et des Congrès" was inaugurated. By 1989, the market reached more than 2000 exhibitors and 600 screenings

1990
In November 1995, Jérome Paillard became Executive Director and continued the expansion of the Marché. His goal was particularly to enlarge the Marché to all the companies including those not exhibiting in the Marché but in the hotels and apartments. In 1996, the Marché du Film launched "The Guide": a printed guide which provided attendees a full index of participants. In 1997, "The Guide” became available on CD-ROM and finally turned into an online database in 1999. This database is what preceded Cinando.

2000
The Riviera building opened in 2000 adding 10,000 m² to the Palais des Festival et des Congrès. This new building allowed the Marché du Film to have more screening rooms as well as more space for the sales companies to be represented.

International attendance at the Marché
Over the years, the Marché du Film's international influence has grown and professionals from the film industry from all continents attend. The three main countries present at the Marché du Film 2019 edition are: the United States (2,264), France (1,943) and the United Kingdom (1,145). While more than half of the participants come from Europe (with an increase of 4% for a total of 7,076 participants), the most notable growth in participants comes from Africa (with an increase of 22% for a total of 175 participants).

Key Dates
 1946 : First Festival de Cannes
 1959 : First Marché du Film
 1980 : Creation of the "Secretariat General du Marché du Film" by the "Association du Festival"
 1982 : Inauguration of the new "Palais des Festival & des Congrès"
 1996 : First edition of "The Guide" under Jérôme Paillard
 2000 : Opening of the "Riviera"
 2003 : Launch of Cinando

Key Numbers

Represented countries
 54(1992)
 121 (2019)

Represented companies
 1,010 (1992)
 5,528 (2019)

Participants
 1,947 (1992)
 3,105 (1996)
 12,527 (2019)

Industry Programs
A number of programs are provided during the Marché du Film for the benefit of producers, directors, festival programmers, sales agents, and other film industry professionals.

Cannes XR
Cannes XR is a program fully dedicated to immersive technologies and entertainment located at the Palais des Festivals. Through talks, showcases and social events, Cannes XR is a place to discuss the role of XR technologies to inspire the art of storytelling, shape the future of film and be inspired by the work of visionary artists and business leaders.

Cannes Docs
Cannes Docs includes panels, talks, special screenings, workshops, opportunities to consult with experts, one-on-one meetings, tutoring, as well as selected showcases of docs-in-progress from all around the world (Norway, Mali, Germany, Kenya, Palestine, Chile, Algeria, Canada, Egypt, Argentina, Georgia, South Africa, Mexico, Burkina Faso, Tunisia…). Cannes Docs is particularly relevant for producers with films in advanced stages of production who are looking for a festival premiere and/or for a sales agent, or for sellers and programmers looking for the latest undiscovered documentary. It's also a B-to-B platform designed to connect professionals to other documentary professionals, promote festival, company or organization, expand network and develop projects.

Cannes Next
It connects with those who imagine and create the cinema of tomorrow: the Marché du Film gives the floor to visionaries, international executives and leading investors from Hollywood to Asia. Cannes Next organizes pitching sessions, conferences, demo stage etc.

Animation Day
The Marché du Film has partnered with the Annecy Festival for Animation Day: a program of conferences, meetings and work-in-progress presentations of distribution and production of animated films.

Goes to Cannes
Goes to Cannes spotlights work-in-progress projects looking for sales agents, distributors or festival selection.

Frontieres
Organised by the Fantasia International Film Festival in partnership with the Marché du Film – Festival de Cannes, Frontières is an international co-production market and networking platform specifically focused on genre film financing and co-production between Europe and North America. It began in 2012 at Fantasia and is now the leading industry event entirely focused on genre film. Frontières @ Cannes present two projects selections: Proof of Concept and Frontières Buyers Showcase. The Proof of Concept is the presentation where projects in advanced financing stages are seeking partners to secure the final pieces of their budget by pitching their project. Frontier Buyer Showcase is where the selection of works-in-progress or completed film are presented by their producers or sales-agents.

Producers Network
Launched 15 years ago, the Producers Network welcomes more than 500 producers from all around the world for a series of meetings and unique events specifically designed to create opportunities to build your peer network and get international co-production projects off the ground.

Cannes Workshops
Cannes Workshops is a program of workshops and conferences led by industry experts from all over the world invited to Cannes to share their cinema savoir-faire and give updates on the current trends in film production, financing and distribution.

Village International
As a place of meetings and exchanges, the Village International is a collection of pavilions representing countries from around the world to promote their cinema, their cultures and institutions.

Fantastic 7
Fantastic 7 is a joint initiative of the Marché du Film, Sitges Film Festival and international expert Bernardo Bergeret. Fantastic 7 was created to foster the emergence of new talent and connect with potential business partners by creating a privileged space for dialogue and reflection supported by leading international fantasy film festivals.

Mixers
The Marché du Film's networking “Mixers” are friendly get togethers in the unique setting of the Plage des Palmes designed to help professionals forge lasting ties around shared interests.
 The Fantastic Fanatics Mixer: for genre film buffs.
 The Doc Lovers Mixer: for non-fiction film professionals.
 The Festivals & Sales Agents Mixer: for festival programmers and sales agents.

Speed Meetings
The Marché du Film organized 20-minute meetings with other professionals based on preferences and current projects.

Bridging the Dragon
Bridging the Dragon is a program which intends to contribute to a better understanding between the Chinese and European markets and to create content as well as new business collaborations.

Shoot the Book
Shoot the Book! is an initiative that will bring together about 40 publishers and international producers seeking future projects.

Meet the streamers
Meet the streamers invites professionals to discover new streaming platforms and connect with the people behind this technology.

Coaching Group Sessions
Coaching sessions with industry experts are organized with National Institutions.

Cinando

The Marché du Film operates Cinando, the largest professional database of the film industry, containing information of contacts, projects in development, films for sale, and schedules of upcoming festivals. Cinando has partnered with major film events, such as the Berlin EFM, Toronto International Film Festival, and the American Film Market.

Cinando offers its members a substantial database and an extensive range of services to help its members promote their projects, find potential partners and prepare for international film markets. Over 84,000 people, 37,000 companies and 64,000 films and projects are part of the community.

Cinando currently exists in three languages: English, Spanish and Mandarin and is available on desktop and mobile phones via the Cinando app.

Features and Services
A number of services are provided during the Marché du Film for the benefit of producers, directors, festival programmers, sales agents, and other film industry professionals.

Match & Meet App
In 2019, the Marché du Film offered its participants a networking platform and application for Cinema professionals to meet directly during the Marché. The app suggests professionals matches based on mutual interests, and give the possibility to chat and schedule meetings with co-producers, financiers, partners and prospects.

Screenings
The Marché du Film offers a choice of 33 screening rooms. In 2019, over 850 films were screened (of which 693 premieres) with a total of almost 1,464 screenings. 2,768 were on the market on sale, including 332 documentaries.

Notes and references

External links
Marché du Film official website
Cannes Film Festival official website
Cinando professional film database
Indie Filmmaker website
Marché du Film 2008 sur DeVilDead (French)
Marché du Film 2009 sur DeVilDead (French)

Cannes Film Festival
Film markets